The Simon Abraham Duplex is a historic house located in Portland, Oregon, United States. Built in 1890 in the Queen Anne style, it is one of few duplexes in the Eliot neighborhood remaining from the late-19th to early-20th centuries. Its early ownership by German Americans and Scandinavian Americans testifies to the settlement by ethnic immigrants in this part of the former city of Albina.

The duplex was listed on the National Register of Historic Places in 1999.

See also
National Register of Historic Places listings in Northeast Portland, Oregon

References

External links
 

, National Register of Historic Places cover documentation

1890 establishments in Oregon
Eliot, Portland, Oregon
German-American culture in Portland, Oregon
Houses completed in 1890
Houses on the National Register of Historic Places in Portland, Oregon
Northeast Portland, Oregon
Queen Anne architecture in Oregon
Scandinavian-American culture
Portland Historic Landmarks